Sigurður Helgason (July 20, 1921 – February 8, 2009) was an innovator in low-cost airlines.

Helgason is credited with pioneering the "hippie airline", Loftleiðir, that made low-cost air travel to Europe possible for generations of Americans.

Biography 
Born July 20, 1921, in the Icelandic capital, Reykjavík, Sigurður Helgason came to the United States in his 20s and graduated with a business degree from Columbia University in New York in 1947. He then returned to Iceland, where he managed a cement company.

In 1953, Helgason joined the board of Loftleiðir, a small airline that had been formed by three pilots nine years earlier. At the time, the International Air Transport Association (IATA) controlled its members' fares. As a non-member, Loftleiðir, or Icelandic Airlines in English, was able to significantly undercut other transatlantic carriers' pricing, and it began service from New York to Luxembourg in 1955. According to Guðjón Arngrímsson, Icelandair's former Vice President for Corporate Communication, Helgason was a "very key player" in the strategy.

Helgason managed the American operations of the company from 1961 to 1973. At that point, Loftleiðir was merged with Flugfélag Íslands to form Icelandair and he returned to Reykjavik to become its CEO. He stepped down as chief executive in 1984, assuming the position of chairman until retirement in 1991. He then lived in Iceland, Mustique, and New York City.

Helgason's main interests after retirement were fly fishing and the International House of New York. He leased many rivers across Iceland, including the Hofsa. As a member of the International House of New York, he served on the board of directors, where he won the Harry Edmonds Award.

Helgason died aged 87 on the island of Mustique in the Grenadines, where he spent winters. Helgason was the first and only non-native to be buried on the island.

References

1921 births
2009 deaths
Columbia Business School alumni
20th-century Icelandic businesspeople
Deaths in Saint Vincent and the Grenadines
Chief executives in the airline industry
Icelandic expatriates in the United States